José Miguel Carlos Piñera Echenique, known in Chile by his nickname "Negro" Piñera (born October 18, 1954) is a Chilean celebrity, night club owner and amateur musician. He is the brother of President of Chile Sebastián Piñera and of economist José Piñera. Piñera was married to Argentinean model Belén Hidalgo. Negro Piñera is of Asturian and Basque descent.

Miguel Piñera is the fifth son of José Piñera Carvallo and Magdalena Echenique Rozas. His siblings are Guadalupe, José, Sebastián, Pablo, and María Teresa.

He studied at the Colegio del Verbo Divino, and Saint George's School. During his adolescence, he lived in Belgium through his father's role as the Chilean ambassador to Belgium and the United Nations. His father's profession would also later take him to live in New York City.

At the age of fifteen, he received his first electric guitar and developed his musical talent. He participated in South America's largest music festival, Festival de la Canción de Viña del Mar, in 1983.

He is a well-known celebrity in the Chilean show and nightclub business.

References

1954 births
Living people
Chilean male guitarists
20th-century Chilean male singers
Chilean songwriters
Chilean people of Basque descent
Chilean people of Spanish descent
People from Santiago
Miguel Pinera
Colegio del Verbo Divino alumni
People of Inca royalty descent
Chilean television personalities
Bailando por un Sueño (Argentine TV series) participants
20th-century Chilean male artists